Es campur (Indonesian for "mixed ice") is an Indonesian cold and sweet dessert concoction of fruit cocktails, coconut, tapioca pearls, grass jellies, etc. served in shaved ice, syrup and condensed milk.

In Indonesia, es campur is sold from humble traveling trolley to restaurants. For Indonesian Muslims, es campur and kolak are popular treats during Ramadan for iftar, often sold prior to breaking the fast. It is quite similar to es teler and es doger although with different content.

The ingredients might vary, since the term campur means "mix". It may consist of coconut, sea weed, milk, syrup, jackfruit, and many others.

See also

Shaved ice § Regions, for similar shaved ice variations around the world.
Kakigōri: Japanese shaved ice
Bingsu: Korean shaved ice
Halo-halo: Filipino shaved ice (derived from Japanese Kakigori)
Tshuah-ping: Taiwanese shaved ice
Namkhaeng sai and O-aew: Thai shaved ice
Ais Kacang (ABC): Malaysian shaved ice
Grattachecca: Italian shaved ice popular in Rome.
Hawaiian shave ice: Hawaiian shaved ice

References

External links
 Mixed Shaved Ice Dessert – Es Campur recipe from Indonesian Food Recipe
 Es Campur Jakarta recipe (in Indonesian)
 Es Campur Sariwangi (in Indonesian)

Indonesian desserts
Fruit dishes
Ice-based desserts
Street food in Indonesia